The Arizona–Arizona State baseball rivalry is a college baseball rivalry between the University of Arizona Wildcats and the Arizona State University Sun Devils. Both programs are two of the most storied and successful in college baseball history, combining for a total of 9 College World Series championships, 40 College World Series appearances, 81 NCAA Tournament appearances and 27 conference regular-season championships. Since Arizona State (then-Tempe Normal School) founded a baseball program in 1907 the teams have met 484 times.

History

Early History 
Though both teams had fielded baseball teams since the beginning of the century, the rivalry did not truly develop until the 1950s. Prior the establishment of the varsity baseball program at Arizona State in 1959, Arizona had dominated the Sun Devils collecting a record of 115–18. Things would change quickly beginning with Bobby Winkles' tenure: by 1965, Arizona State had doubled its total number of victories over Arizona, appeared in the College World Series twice and had won its 1st College World Series championship - something Arizona had yet to do in 7 College World Series appearances to that point. Before the end of the decade the Sun Devils would win two more College World Series in 1967 and 1969.

The Brock–Kindall years 
Under the helms of Jim Brock and Jerry Kindall, the rivalry reached a new level of intensity. Longtime sports columnist Greg Hansen of the Arizona Daily Star described the rivalry between Brock and Kindall as the greatest between any Arizona-Arizona State coaching duo in any sport. During the 1970s and early 1980s, the teams reached the peak of their joint prominence: the Wildcats and Sun Devils would win College World Series titles back-to-back with each other in 1976–77 and 1980–81. Perhaps the most important game played between the two was a 1976 College World Series semi-final matchup (see below) in which Arizona defeated Arizona State 5–1 to advance to the College World Series title game against Eastern Michigan, ending Arizona State's season. The Wildcats won their first College World Series title the next game.

1990s–present 
In recent years the rivalry has been dominated in stretches by each team. Arizona State generally dominated the rivalry in the 1990s and 2000s, making many College World Series appearances while Arizona struggled and made only a single one - in 2004.

The 2010s were however dominated by Arizona, who have made 3 College World Series appearances since the Sun Devils' last appearance - winning once and running-up once. The Wildcats have also won 2 Pac-12 titles since the Sun Devils' last in 2010.

Venues 
Aside from 6 games, each game in the series has been played either at the Wildcats' home fields in Tucson or the Sun Devils' home fields in Phoenix and Tempe. In fact, only a single regular season game has been played outside of the state of Arizona - a 1994 matchup held at the Hubert H. Humphrey Metrodome in Minneapolis, MN.

Arizona's home field was UA Field from 1929 to 1966, Wildcat Field (later Frank Sancet Stadium then Jerry Kindall Field at Frank Sancet Stadium) from 1967 to 2011 and Hi Corbett Field from 2012–Present. Arizona played selected home games at Hi Corbett Field from 1940 to 1975, including all games against Arizona State between 1965 and 1974.

Arizona State's home field was Goodwin Stadium from 1959 to 1963, Phoenix Municipal Stadium from 1964 to 1973 and Packard Stadium from 1974 to 2014. In 2015, the Sun Devils returned to Phoenix Municipal Stadium where they remain today. Arizona State played the 2002 season at HoHoKam Park in Mesa, AZ due to construction at Packard Stadium, however the only games played that season between the teams were held in Tucson.

Coaching record comparison

Games played 
The Wildcats and Sun Devils have been members of the same conference since 1931 - the Border Conference from 1931 to 1962, Western Athletic Conference from 1962 to 1978 and Pacific-10 (now Pac-12) Conference from 1978–Present. From 1963 to 2000, the teams played 6 conference games a year. Since 2001 the Wildcats and Sun Devils have played 3 conference games a season - alternating hosts each year - usually supplemented with a pair of non-conference matchups hosted by the team not hosting the conference games. Over the years the Wildcats and Sun Devils have also participated in multi-year events against each other:

 From 1977 to 1978 Arizona and Arizona State jointly hosted the Best in the West Tournament in Tucson and Tempe; participating teams included Eastern Michigan, Grand Canyon, Northern Arizona, Oregon State and Pepperdine.
 From 2006 to 2007 Arizona and Arizona State participated in the Challenge at Chase - a yearly neutral site game held at the Arizona Diamondbacks' home Chase Field in Phoenix, AZ.

Notable games 

 April 21, 1956 (Rendezvous Park - Mesa, AZ): The Wildcats beat the Sun Devils 7–0 as Arizona's Carl Thomas pitched the first no-hitter in school history, along with 12 strikeouts.
 May 14, 1966 (Hi Corbett Field - Tucson, AZ): Arizona and Arizona State faced off with the WAC South championship at stake. Arizona won 6–1 to claim the championship. The Wildcats would go on to appear in the College World Series.
 May 21, 1967 (Phoenix Municipal Stadium - Phoenix, AZ): In another game with the WAC South championship at stake, future MLB pitcher Gary Gentry pitched all 15 innings for Arizona State as the Sun Devils clinched the championship in a 3–2 victory. ASU would go on to win its 2nd College World Series title.
 April 18, 1975 (Wildcat Field - Tucson, AZ): In the first night game in Wildcat Field history, Arizona State defeated Arizona 9–1. Arizona State pitcher Floyd Bannister struck out 17 and took a no-hit bid into the 8th inning.
 June 17, 1976 (Johnny Rosenblatt Stadium - Omaha, NE): In perhaps the most important game played in the rivalry's history, Arizona and Arizona State played each other in a College World Series elimination game to decide which team would play Eastern Michigan in the national title game. This was the second of only two postseason games played between the two all-time, the first having been 5 days earlier in which Arizona State had won 7–6 in controversial fashion (Arizona catcher Ron Hassey was called out at 3rd in a close play in the 10th inning that stemmed off an Arizona comeback attempt). Arizona pitcher Steve Powers faced off against Arizona State starting pitcher Don Hanna, who had a 15–0 record to that point. Powers pitched the entire game and allowed only 1 run as Arizona won 5–1 to advance to their 4th College World Series title game, ending Arizona State's season. Sun Devils coach Jim Brock described the loss as being so painful that "[i]t was like a death in the family." Arizona would go on to win their first national championship the next day, with Powers being named College World Series MVP.
 February 27, 1982 (Packard Stadium - Tempe, AZ): The only tie in series history, 4-4.
 March 6, 1994 (Hubert H. Humphrey Metrodome - Minneapolis, MN): The only regular season matchup ever played outside of the state of Arizona as part of the Metrodome Classic. Arizona State won 12–4. The Sun Devils advanced on the College World Series for the 2nd straight season.
 March 4, 2000 (Packard Stadium - Tempe, AZ): Arizona State defeats Arizona 32–3 in the largest victory in series history.
 May 27, 2012 (Hi Corbett Field - Tucson, AZ): Having squandered an early 7–1 lead, Arizona defeated Arizona State 8–7 on a 2-out walk-off single from Wildcats left fielder Johnny Field to clinch their first Pac-12 Conference championship (shared with UCLA) since 1992. The Wildcats would go on to win their first College World Series title since 1986, and 4th overall.

Scores of games (1959–2022)

Achievements by season (1959–2022)

References

College baseball rivalries in the United States
Arizona Wildcats baseball
Arizona State Sun Devils baseball